Sandra L. "Sandy" Murman (born August 9, 1950) is a former Republican member of the Florida House of Representatives. She was first elected as a Democrat in 1996, but switched parties in 1997. In 2006, Murman ran for the Florida Senate. However, she lost the Republican primary to Ronda Storms. Murman was elected to the Hillsborough County Commission in 2010, representing District 1. In 2020, Murman ran for District 6, but she lost to Pat Kemp.

References

External links
Sandra Murman at Ballotpedia
Project Vote Smart – Representative Sandra Murman (FL) profile
Our Campaigns – Sandra Murman (FL) profile
Florida House of Representatives -Sandra Murman

 
|-

Living people
Indiana University alumni
1950 births
Republican Party members of the Florida House of Representatives
Women state legislators in Florida
21st-century American women